Mária Hámos was a Hungarian gymnast. She competed in the women's artistic team all-around event at the 1928 Summer Olympics.

References

Year of birth missing
Year of death missing
Hungarian female artistic gymnasts
Olympic gymnasts of Hungary
Gymnasts at the 1928 Summer Olympics
Place of birth missing